Repeat may refer to:

 Rerun, a rebroadcast of an episode of a radio or television program
 Repeated sequence (DNA), a pattern of nucleic acid (DNA or RNA) that occurs in multiple copies throughout the genome
 CRISPR
 The smallest rectangle that can be tiled to form the whole pattern of a wallpaper

Music
"Repeat" (song), a 2011 song by David Guetta
Repeat sign, in sheet music, notation that a section should be repeated
Repeat Records, a British independent record label
Repeat, a 1993 EP by This Heat
Repeat – The Best of Jethro Tull – Vol II, a 1977 album

See also
Repetition (disambiguation)
Repeater (disambiguation)
Do while loop, a control statement in computer programing, sometimes called repeat until